Mary Lazarus (born 5 May 1989) is a Nigerian actress  and movie producer who won the City People Movie Award for Most Promising Actress of the Year (English) at the City People Entertainment Awards in 2018 and was nominated, for Best Actress in a leading role in the same year at the Best of Nollywood Awards. She also won the award for Most Peaceful Actress of the Year.

Early life and education
Lazarus hails from Abia State in Nigeria, a southeastern geographical location of Nigeria predominantly occupied by the Igbo people of Nigeria. Lazarus is specifically from Ukwa East Local Government Area of Abia State and was born into a family of nine consisting of a mother, a father and six siblings of which she is a twin and one of the last born children of the family alongside her twin brother named Joseph. Lazarus upon receiving both primary and secondary education and obtaining her First School Leaving Certificate and the West African Senior School Certificate respectively applied to University of Ibadan in bid to obtain a university degree. She was accepted and granted admission to study Geography, in the institution where she eventually graduated with a 4.4 cumulative grade point average with a B.Sc. degree in Geography.

Career
Lazarus who is popularly known, for her roles in diverse Nollywood movies debuted first as a model in 2002 before venturing into the Nigerian movie industry in 2009 with a movie titled “Waiting Years” She secured a role in the movie through the help of Gbenro Ajibade who introduced her to John Njamah, the director of the movie who eventually assigned her a  role in the aforementioned movie.  Lazarus made her directorial debut with a movie titled “Dance To My Beat” of which she also produced in 2017.

Lazarus as a model has made appearances in commercials by Airtel and MTN.

Influence
Lazarus, in an interview with the Vanguard print media named Nollywood veteran actresses Omotola Jalade Ekeinde and Joke Silva as her role models in the Nigerian movie industry. Lazarus in another interview with The Punch print media named American actress Kimberly Elise as one who she admires because of her extensive body of work.

Award and nomination

Personal life
Lazarus comes from a family of nine and is one of the last born children of her parents alongside her twin brother. In an interview with The Punch print media she described herself as a fun-loving person.

Selected filmography and TV series 
When Life Happens (2020) as Cindy | with Lota Chukwu, Jimmy Odukoya, Wole Ojo
My Woman (2019) as Zara | with Seun Akinyele, Ujams C'briel
Accidental Affair (2019) as Kristen
Clustered Colours (2019)
Broken Pieces (2018)
Homely: What Men Want (2018) as Keji
Dance To My Beat (2017)
The Road Not Taken II (2017)
Love Lost (2017) as Rena
Girls Are Not Smiling (2016)
What Makes You Tick (2016) as Ann Okojie
Okafor's Law (2016) as Kamsi
Better Than The Beginning (2015)
Bad Drop (2015)
Losing Control (2015) as Uche
Second Chances (2014) as Justina
Desperate Housegirls (2013)
Waiting Years (2009)

References

External links

Living people
1986 births
21st-century Nigerian actresses
Igbo actresses
University of Ibadan alumni
Nigerian film actresses
Actresses from Abia State
Nigerian film producers
Nigerian film award winners